Atherinosoma is a genus of silversides from the coastal waters of south-eastern Australia.

Species
The currently recognized species in this genus are:
 Atherinosoma elongata (Klunzinger, 1879) (elongated hardyhead)
 Atherinosoma microstoma (Günther, 1861) (small-mouth hardyhead)

References

 
Atherininae
Taxa named by François-Louis Laporte, comte de Castelnau
Ray-finned fish genera